The Nonstop Liberal Arts Institute was the educational program supported by Nonstop Antioch, a movement organized by alumni and former students, staff and faculty of Antioch College to keep Antioch College alive and operating in Yellow Springs, Ohio.  Nonstop was supported for one year by the Antioch College Alumni Association through the College Revival Fund. Originally organized in 2007 shortly after Antioch University announced the closure of the original college and campus, the effort was first known as "Antioch-College-in-Exile" but changed its name after the university threatened a lawsuit over use of the Antioch name or other identifiers. The Nonstop effort was not supported by or affiliated with the Antioch University system.

It was a radical experiment in education, described in the Nonstop curriculum written in summer 2008 as reimagining "education for the twenty-first century as progressive liberal arts for life," and further "Significant aspects of our educational curriculum are inspired by the interests and needs of the immediate community and its environment. Indeed, the curriculum of the Institute is distinctive in its historically unprecedented level of integration into, and collaboration with, the surrounding community." Nonstop was founded as a college without a campus, inhabiting churches, coffee shops and homes around the village of Yellow Springs. and served local residents as well as traditionally aged students. The Nonstop Liberal Arts Institute Facebook Group includes this description: "The Nonstop curriculum adheres to the principles of excellence and rigor while exploring new educational frontiers. In addition to the rigorous curriculum, 'Nonstop Presents' will energize the Miami Valley region by offering a series of lectures, cultural events, and festivals throughout the year!"

On July 18, 2008, the Trustees of Antioch University reached a preliminary agreement with the Antioch College Alumni Association. The preliminary agreement created a framework to "address issues including determining the future real estate of Antioch College, and how the name associated with Antioch College and Antioch University will be protected and reserved by either or both parties." The refocus on reopening Antioch College, whose first students arrived in the fall of 2011, ended funding of Nonstop Liberal Arts Institute.

References

External links
 Official website
 College Revival Fund
 Antioch College Alumni Association
 Antioch College Action Network (ACAN)

Antioch College